Kerry-Anne Tomlinson (born 19 January 1990) is a New Zealand cricketer who currently plays for Central Districts.

Tomlinson was born in Gisborne and lives in Hamilton. She has played in four women's One Day International matches for the Netherlands women's national cricket team. Batting in the middle order, she played all her matches in the 2011 Women's Cricket World Cup Qualifier.

In November 2016, Tomlinson became the first woman to be awarded the New Zealand Māori Cricket Scholarship. The scholarship which recognises Māori talent was awarded to Tomlinson for launching Northern Māori Women, the first women's Māori domestic cricket team in New Zealand's history. Tomlinson is of Ngāti Porou/Te Whānau-ā-Apanui descent.

References

External links 
 
 

1990 births
Central Districts Hinds cricketers
Dutch women cricketers
Living people
Netherlands One Day International cricketers
New Zealand women cricketers
Northern Districts women cricketers
Cricketers from Gisborne, New Zealand
Wellington Blaze cricketers
New Zealand Māori sportspeople
Dragons (women's cricket) cricketers